A Ragamuffin parade is an annual occurrence in communities in the New York metropolitan area. The parades feature children in their Halloween costumes, and typically are held in October or on Halloween. The holiday formed around 1870, a few years after US President Abraham Lincoln declared Thanksgiving a national holiday.

It had its origins with Ragamuffin Day, a celebration as part of Thanksgiving, which involved children going door-to-door seeking candy, dressed as beggars and homeless residents of New York. Ragamuffin Day was a predecessor to Halloween, which rose in popularity in the 1940s and 1950s.

History

Ragamuffin Day
Ragamuffin Day formed around 1870, a few years after US President Abraham Lincoln declared Thanksgiving a national holiday. Ragamuffin Day took place on Thanksgiving, and typically involved children going from door to door asking for candy or money, a tradition that started with mummers in Europe. These children were originally dressed in the style of the homeless of New York, with rags and oversized and exaggerated imitations of beggars. In further years, the children dressed as sailors, bandits and Disney characters. In the 1930s, the begging tradition was superseded by Ragamuffin parades, a predecessor of Thanksgiving Day parades. As Halloween became popular after the Great Depression, Ragamuffin events became less popular, however, children continued the traditions into the 1940s.

Around 1930, The New York Times published several articles in an attempt to end the tradition, that the children would "annoy adults" on Thanksgiving Day with their pleas for candy, money, and gifts. Later that year, the newspaper reported that the parades were scarce in New York City, except in its outskirts, where the subway lines end.

By 1937, several organizations began hosting Thanksgiving Day parades to discourage Ragamuffins, where the Thanksgiving parades would also feature children dressed both as beggars and in Halloween costumes. In the 1940s, some of these parades involved around 500 children. The last recorded Thanksgiving Day Ragamuffin parade was in 1956, overshadowed by Macy's Thanksgiving Day Parade. A Ragamuffin parade on October 15, 1972 in Bay Ridge, Brooklyn, brought about 6,000 children and a crowd of around 35,000, making it the largest Ragamuffin parade in the United States at that time.

Present day
Ragamuffin parades continued in the outer boroughs of New York City after losing popularity in Manhattan. The parades are still held in the area, including in Bay Ridge, held since 1966, Park Ridge, New Jersey, and in Hoboken, New Jersey. Other communities include the Westchester County municipalities Pleasantville and Briarcliff Manor (where the parade has been held for about 30 years).

In September 2016, a street in Bay Ridge was renamed "Ragamuffin Way" in honor of the neighborhood's 50-year-old tradition.

See also

 Evacuation Day

References

External links

Annual events in New York (state)
Halloween
Holidays related to the American Revolution
New York (state) culture
November observances
October observances
Public holidays in the United States
Thanksgiving (United States)
Observances in New York City